The Milwaukee Brewers' 2001 season involved the Brewers' finishing 4th in the National League Central with a record of 68 wins and 94 losses. The 2001 Brewers scored 740 runs, 11th in the NL, and ranked 1st in strikeouts, with 1,399. It was their first season at the newly built Miller Park.

Offseason
December 20, 2000: Brian Lesher was signed as a free agent with the Milwaukee Brewers.
 January 3, 2001: Mark Sweeney was signed as a free agent with the Milwaukee Brewers.
January 8, 2001: Jason McDonald was signed as a free agent with the Milwaukee Brewers.
February 8, 2001: Tony Fernández was signed as a free agent with the Milwaukee Brewers.
 February 24, 2001: Marquis Grissom was traded by the Milwaukee Brewers with a player to be named later to the Los Angeles Dodgers for Devon White. The Milwaukee Brewers sent Ruddy Lugo (June 1, 2001) to the Los Angeles Dodgers to complete the trade.

Regular season

Season standings

Record vs. opponents

Transactions
May 29, 2001: Tony Fernández was released by the Milwaukee Brewers.
July 30, 2001: Dave Weathers was traded by the Milwaukee Brewers with Roberto Miniel (minors) to the Chicago Cubs for Ruben Quevedo and Pete Zoccolillo.

Roster

Player stats

Batting

Starters by position
Note: Pos = Position; G = Games played; AB = At bats; R = Runs; H = Hits; HR = Home runs; RBI = Runs batted in; Avg. = Batting average; SB = Stolen bases

Other batters
Note: G = Games played; AB = At bats; R = Runs; H = Hits; HR = Home runs; RBI = Runs batted in; Avg. = Batting average; SB = Stolen bases

Note: Batting statistics for pitchers are not included above.

Pitching

Starting pitchers 
Note: G = Games pitched; IP = Innings pitched; W = Wins; L = Losses; ERA = Earned run average; SO = Strikeouts

Other pitchers 
Note: G = Games pitched; IP = Innings pitched; W = Wins; L = Losses; ERA = Earned run average; SO = Strikeouts

Relief pitchers 
Note: G = Games pitched; W = Wins; L = Losses; SV = Saves; ERA = Earned run average; SO = Strikeouts

Farm system

The Brewers' farm system consisted of eight minor league affiliates in 2001. The Brewers operated a Venezuelan Summer League team as a co-op with the Boston Red Sox and Minnesota Twins. The Huntsville Stars won the Southern League championship, and the DSL Brewers won the Dominican Summer League championship.

References

2001 Milwaukee Brewers team page at Baseball Reference
2001 Milwaukee Brewers team page at www.baseball-almanac.com

Milwaukee Brewers seasons
Milwaukee Brewers season
Milwaukee Brew